Narutchai Nimboon (born 24 May 1995) is a Thai professional footballer who plays as a defensive midfielder.

References

External links
 

1996 births
Living people
Narutchai Nimboon
Narutchai Nimboon
Association football forwards
Narutchai Nimboon
Narutchai Nimboon